Barry Toy (born 20 April 1939) is a former Australian rules footballer who played for the Hawthorn Football Club in the Victorian Football League (VFL).

Notes

External links 

Living people
1939 births
Australian rules footballers from Victoria (Australia)
Hawthorn Football Club players